Milan Ćulum (born 28 October 1984) is a Serbian professional footballer who played as a defensive midfielder for Kolubara. He is known for hard-tackling style of play, often resulting in yellow and red cards.

Career
During his journeyman career, Ćulum played for numerous clubs in his homeland and abroad, including Cement Beočin, OFK Beograd, Srem (three brief loan spells), Spartak Subotica (loan), Čukarički, Smederevo, Željezničar Sarajevo (Bosnia and Herzegovina), Volgar Astrakhan (Russia), Hajduk Kula, Radnički Niš (two spells), Radnički Kragujevac, Radnik Surdulica, Rad, Sloboda Tuzla (Bosnia and Herzegovina), Partizani Tirana (Albania), Inter Zaprešić (Croatia), and Kolubara.

Honours
Željezničar Sarajevo
 Premier League of Bosnia and Herzegovina: 2009–10

Borac Čačak 
  Serbian League West : 2019-20

References

External links
 
 
 
 
 
 Milan Ćulum at Srbijafudbal

Kategoria Superiore players
Association football midfielders
Croatian Football League players
Expatriate footballers in Albania
Expatriate footballers in Bosnia and Herzegovina
Expatriate footballers in Croatia
Expatriate footballers in Russia
FC Volgar Astrakhan players
First League of Serbia and Montenegro players
FK Cement Beočin players
FK Čukarički players
FK Hajduk Kula players
FK Kolubara players
FK Partizani Tirana players
FK Rad players
FK Radnički 1923 players
FK Radnički Niš players
FK Radnik Surdulica players
FK Sloboda Tuzla players
FK Smederevo players
FK Spartak Subotica players
FK Srem players
NK Inter Zaprešić players
OFK Beograd players
FK Borac Čačak players
Premier League of Bosnia and Herzegovina players
Serbian expatriate footballers
Serbian expatriate sportspeople in Albania
Serbian expatriate sportspeople in Bosnia and Herzegovina
Serbian expatriate sportspeople in Croatia
Serbian expatriate sportspeople in Russia
Serbian First League players
Serbian footballers
Serbian SuperLiga players
Footballers from Novi Sad
1984 births
Living people